Mukhiguda is a census town in Kalahandi district in the Indian state of Odisha. Mukhiguda is one of the villages in Jayapatna tehsil.

History 
Mukhiguda is famous for Indravati Power Plant, which is one of India's largest  and Asia's second-largest power house. The hydro-electric project of Odisha produces 600 MW electricity and took almost 15 years for its completion.

Demographics
 India census, Mukhiguda had a population of 1,910. Males constitute 9,24 of the population and females 9,86.In Mukhiguda total literacy population is  6,69, So Mukhiguda has an average literacy rate of 35%, smaller than the national average of 59.5%: male literacy is 76%, and female literacy is 24%. In Mukhiguda, 13% of the population is under 6 years of age.

Education

Schools
 Upper primary Project school
 Upper Indravati Project High school
 Saraswati sishu vidya mandir
 Swami Vivekananda English medium school
 venkateswar an english medium school

Colleges
 Indravati (Degree) Mahavidyalaya

See also 
 Kalahandi district
 Bhawanipatna
 Jaipatna
 Junagarh

References

External links 
 Indravati Hydro Electricity Project
 See the maps and census

Cities and towns in Kalahandi district